Ludhiana Airport  is the regional airport serving the city of Ludhiana and other sub-cities of Ludhiana District in Punjab. A few years after the opening of the airport there was a Flight Club based in the airport.

This Airport will be closed after the creation of Ludhiana International Airport at Halwara (11 March 2023)

Airlines and destinations

External links
Official site at the Airports Authority of India

Transport in Ludhiana
Airports in Punjab, India
Science and technology in Ludhiana
Buildings and structures in Ludhiana
Airports with year of establishment missing